The Lockheed D-21 is an American supersonic reconnaissance drone. The D-21 was initially designed to be launched from the back of an M-21 carrier aircraft, a variant of the Lockheed A-12 aircraft. Development began in October 1962. Originally known by the Lockheed designation Q-12, the drone was intended for reconnaissance deep into enemy airspace.

The D-21 was designed to carry a single high-resolution photographic camera over a preprogrammed path, then release the camera module into the air for retrieval, after which the drone would self-destruct. Following a fatal accident when launched from an M-21, the D-21 was modified to be launched from a Boeing B-52 Stratofortress. Several test flights were made, followed by four unsuccessful operational D-21 flights over the People's Republic of China, before the program was canceled in 1971.

Design and development
In the 1960s Lockheed's secret Skunk Works developed the Mach 3 A-12 reconnaissance aircraft for the Central Intelligence Agency (CIA). After the shooting down of the U-2 piloted by Gary Powers in 1960, a number of different concepts were proposed as alternatives. Kelly Johnson, the leader of Skunk Works, developed the concept of a long-range drone that used much of the A-12's technology. In October 1962 the CIA and the United States Air Force (USAF) instructed Lockheed to study a high-speed, high-altitude drone concept. It was intended to make a one-way trip, eject its camera payload at the end of the mission for recovery, then self-destruct. It had a double-delta wing similar to the A-12's wing design. The Q-12 was to be air-launched from the back of an A-12, and used key technology from the A-12 project, including titanium construction and radar cross-section reduction design features.

Johnson wanted to power the Q-12 with a ramjet engine built by the Marquardt Corporation for the Boeing CIM-10 Bomarc long-range surface-to-air missile. Marquardt and Lockheed had already collaborated on several programs and had a close working relationship. The engine, the RJ43-MA-11, required modification, since it was only designed to burn as long as the missile needed to hit a target, while the Q-12's engine needed to operate at high temperatures for at least an hour and a half at high altitudes. The modified engine was designated RJ43-MA20S-4.

A full-scale mockup of the Q-12 was ready by 7 December 1962, and had already undergone preliminary tests to measure its radar cross-section. Marquardt had also successfully tested the modified RJ-43 in its wind tunnel in the meantime. However, the CIA was not enthusiastic about the Q-12, mostly because the agency was overextended at the time with U-2 missions, getting the A-12 up to speed and covert operations in Southeast Asia. The USAF, however, was interested in the Q-12 as both a reconnaissance platform and a cruise missile and the CIA finally decided to work with the USAF to develop the new drone. Lockheed was awarded a contract in March 1963 for full-scale development of the Q-12.

The camera and its film magazines with an inertial navigation system were carried in a cramped "Q-bay" below the drone's air intake. These components were built into a module that fit into the bay and was known as a "hatch". The hatch would be ejected at the end of the mission and then snagged out of the air by a JC-130 Hercules, a technique that had been developed by the USAF to recover film canisters from satellites. If the C-130 missed, the hatch was equipped with flotation devices so it could be recovered by ship if released over water. Honeywell built the avionics systems; new construction techniques and materials had to be developed for the systems to withstand the high temperatures, extreme vibrations and lack of space in the D-21.

In late 1963 the project was named Tagboard; the Q-12 was re-designated D-21 while the A-12 version launcher became M-21 (D- for "daughter" and M- for "mother"). Two of the original 18 A-12 aircraft were designated as M-21s with serial numbers 60-6940 and 60-6941. The M-21 was a two-seat version of the A-12, with a pylon on the fuselage centerline between the vertical stabilizers to carry the drone in a nose-up attitude.

Testing and carrier change
A D-21 mounted on an M-21 began captive flight-testing on 22 December 1964. Aerodynamic covers were initially placed over the D-21's intake and exhaust to reduce drag, but had to be removed after the first few tests, as no way of discarding them at Mach 3 without damaging the drone or carrier plane could be devised.

The D-21 was first launched from an M-21 on 5 March 1966. The drone was released but stayed close to the M-21's back for a few seconds, which seemed like "two hours" to the M-21 crew. The USAF's interest in the program continued and more D-21s were ordered after the second launch. A third flight took place on 16 June with the D-21 flying  through its complete flight profile, though its camera hatch was not released due to an electronics failure.

The fourth and final launch from an M-21 on 30 July ended in disaster. Unlike the three previous launches this one was performed straight and level, not in an outside loop to assist in the separation of the drone from the aircraft. The D-21 suffered engine problems and struck the M-21's tail after separation, leading to the destruction of both aircraft. The two crew ejected and landed at sea. The pilot, Bill Park, survived, but the Launch Control Officer, Ray Torrick, drowned.

Following the accident, Johnson suggested launching the D-21 from the Boeing B-52 Stratofortress bomber and adding a solid rocket booster to get it up to speed. The drone was modified by adding attachment points on its spine to mate with the carrying pylon on the B-52 and its belly attachment points were adapted to accommodate the rocket booster necessary to increase its speed and allow its ramjet to operate. Its vertical stabilizer was increased in size by approximately 20%. The modified drone version was designated D-21B (there was no D-21A). Two B-52Hs were modified to carry a pair of drones each by means of two large underwing pylons that replaced the smaller pylons used for the AGM-28 Hound Dog cruise missiles. The tail gunner's and electronic warfare officer's stations were replaced with two launch control stations. Command and telemetry systems were added, and high-speed cameras were installed to track the drones as they separated from the pylons. The launch control officer on the B-52H could communicate with the D-21B and could make it self-destruct.

It had a folding tail fin on the bottom to stabilize it while the rocket was firing. During ground handling everyone within  was required to wear anti-static straps to prevent any discharge of static electricity that might ignite the booster.

The first attempted launch of a D-21B was on 28 September 1967, but the drone fell off the B-52's launch pylon due to a stripped nut on the pylon before the aircraft reached its intended launch point. Johnson admitted that the incident was "very embarrassing". Three more launches were performed from November 1967 through January 1968. None were completely successful, so Johnson ordered his team to conduct a thorough review before renewing launch attempts. The next launch was on 10 April 1968. It also failed as the engine did not ignite. On 16 June the D-21B finally made a completely successful flight; it flew at the specified altitude and course for its full range, and the hatch was recovered. The next two launches were failures, followed by another successful flight in December. A test in February 1969 to check the inertial navigation system using an actual mission profile was a failure. The next two flights in May and July succeeded.

Operational history

Four operational missions with the D-21B took place under the codename of Senior Bowl. These were conducted over the People's Republic of China from 9 November 1969 to 20 March 1971 to spy on the Lop Nor nuclear test site. The USAF's 4200th Support Squadron, based at Beale Air Force Base, California, flew the missions, usually from Andersen Air Force Base in Guam.

The Chinese government never reported spotting the D-21B in flight. The first one failed to turn around and continued straight on, crashing in the Soviet Union. Another test flight was conducted on 20 February 1970 in a successful attempt to correct any problems. The second operational mission, however, was not until 16 December 1970. The D-21B reached Lop Nor and returned to the recovery point, but the hatch had a partial parachute failure and was lost at sea with its photographs.

During the third operational mission, on 4 March 1971, the D-21B flew to Lop Nor and returned, and released the hatch, which deployed its parachute, but the midair recovery failed and the hatch fell into the water. The destroyer that tried to retrieve the hatch ran it down and it sank. The fourth, and last, operational flight of the D-21B was on 20 March 1971. It was lost over China on the final segment of the route over China's Yunnan province; wreckage was found by local authorities. In 2010, after being in the junkyard of the China Aviation Museum for years, the wreckage was moved to the exhibition area.

On 23 July 1971, the D-21B program was canceled due to its poor success rate, the introduction of a new generation of photo reconnaissance satellites, and President Richard Nixon's rapprochement with China. A total of 38 D-21 and D-21B drones had been built, 21 of which were expended in launches. The remaining 17 were initially stored at Norton Air Force Base, California, then moved to the Davis-Monthan Air Force Base "boneyard" near Tucson, Arizona, in 1976 and 1977. With the base open to the public, the D-21 drones were quickly spotted and photographed. The Air Force called them GTD-21Bs with the GT standing for Ground Training.

The fate of the D-21 that had disappeared on the first operational flight was finally revealed in February 1986 when an official from the CIA returned a panel to Ben Rich that he had been given by a Soviet KGB agent. The drone had self-destructed over Siberia and the Soviets had recovered the wreckage. The Tupolev design bureau reverse-engineered the wreck and produced plans for a Soviet copy, named the Voron (Raven), but it was never built.

In the late 1990s NASA considered using a D-21 to test a hybrid rocket-based combined cycle engine, which operates as a ramjet or rocket, depending on its flight regime. Ultimately NASA used a derivative of the agency's X-43A hypersonic test vehicle for the experiments.

Aircraft on display

 D-21B #510 – Museum of Flight, Seattle, Washington (mounted on remaining M-21 #60-6940)
 D-21B #522 – Pacific Coast Air Museum, Sonoma County, California
 D-21B #524 – National Museum of the United States Air Force, Wright-Patterson Air Force Base, Ohio
 D-21B #525 – Blackbird Airpark, Palmdale, California
 D-21B #527 – Chinese Aviation Museum, Beijing, China, wreckage of the unit lost over China on 20 March 1971
 D-21B #528 – Grissom Air Museum near Peru, Indiana 
 D-21B #530 – Aerospace Maintenance and Regeneration Group (AMARG) on Davis–Monthan Air Force Base, Tucson, Arizona.)
 D-21B #533 – Pima Air & Space Museum (adjacent to Davis-Monthan AFB), Tucson, Arizona
 D-21B #534 – Evergreen Aviation Museum, McMinnville, Oregon
 D-21B #537 – March Field Air Museum, March Air Reserve Base, Riverside, California
 D-21B #538 – Southern Museum of Flight, Birmingham, Alabama
 D-21B #539 – Beale Air Force Base, near Marysville, California

Specifications (Lockheed D-21)

D-21 and D-21B without booster
Wingspan: 
Length: 
Height: 
Launch weight: 
Cruise speed: Mach 3.32 (2,524 mph; 4062 km/h)
Maximum speed:  (conversions estimated at the service ceiling altitude)
Service ceiling: 
Range: 
Engine: 1 x Marquardt RJ43-MA-20S4 ramjet, 

Sources: Pace, Landis & Jenkins, Donald

See also

References

Citations

Bibliography

External links

 Loss of M-21 and D-21, including video of successful launches and the midair collision
Directory of U.S. Military Rockets and Missiles
Weapons of Precise Destruction
Photos of Lockheed D-21B No. 527 in China Aviation Museum, Beijing

D-021
1960s United States military reconnaissance aircraft
Unmanned military aircraft of the United States
Single-engined jet aircraft
Ramjet-powered aircraft
Tailless delta-wing aircraft
Unmanned stealth aircraft
Composite aircraft
Aircraft first flown in 1964